Zostera tasmanica is a species of marine eelgrass in the Zosteraceae family. It is native to the seacoasts of Tasmania, New South Wales, Victoria, South Australia, and Western Australia.

References

tasmanica
Flora of Tasmania
Angiosperms of Western Australia
Flora of South Australia
Flora of New South Wales
Flora of Victoria (Australia)
Plants described in 1867
Salt marsh plants
Taxa named by Martin Martens
Taxa named by Paul Friedrich August Ascherson